The 2020 Combined Japan Cup was held from 26 to 27 December 2020 in Saijō city, Ehime Prefecture. It was organized by the JMSCA (Japan Mountaineering and Sport Climbing Association). The athletes competed in combined format of three disciplines: speed, bouldering, and lead. The winner for men was Kokoro Fujii and for women was Miho Nonaka.

Schedule

Competition format 
It was held to simulate the latest Olympic combined format. Athletes competed in a combined format of three disciplines: speed, bouldering, and lead. The ranks of the three disciplines were multiplied to give combined points; athletes with the lowest points won. Eight competitors with the lowest total combined points proceeded to the final round.

Men

Qualifications

Finals

Women

Qualifications

Finals

References

Climbing Japan Cup
2020 in sport climbing